"Don't Toss Us Away" is a song written by Bryan MacLean and recorded by country rock band Lone Justice in 1985 on their self-titled debut album. In 1988, the song was recorded by American country music singer Patty Loveless, who released the song as the second single from her album Honky Tonk Angel, in February 1989. Loveless' version reached the number five position on the Billboard Hot Country Singles chart in May 1989.

Background
Loveless and her brother, Roger Ramey, heard the song while driving with Tony Brown. All of them agreed it would be a good song for her to record, as the ballad fit her vocal style quite well. Maria McKee, songwriter Bryan MacLean's sister, told Loveless at the studio that she was singing/recording the song the way her brother had always intended.

Chart positions
The song charted for 17 weeks on the Billboard Hot Country Singles chart, reaching number 5 during the week of May 6, 1989.

Year-end charts

References

1985 songs
1989 singles
Patty Loveless songs
Song recordings produced by Tony Brown (record producer)
Songs written by Bryan MacLean
Country ballads
MCA Nashville Records singles